Moret-sur-Loing (literally Moret on Loing) is a former commune in the Seine-et-Marne department in the Île-de-France region in north-central France. It is situated on the river Loing, close to its confluence with the Seine. Moret–Veneux-les-Sablons station has rail connections to Montargis, Melun, Montereau-Fault-Yonne, Laroche-Migennes and Paris.

On 1 January 2015, Moret-sur-Loing and Écuelles merged becoming one commune called Orvanne, which merged into the new commune Moret-Loing-et-Orvanne on 1 January 2016.

The town was a source of inspiration for Monet, Renoir and Sisley.

Demographics
Inhabitants of Moret-sur-Loing are called Morétains.

Twin towns
Moret-sur-Loing is twinned with:
  Kilkenny, Co. Kilkenny, Ireland
  Külsheim, Baden-Württemberg, Germany

See also
 Château de Moret
 Communes of the Seine-et-Marne department

Famous people
 Alfred Sisley, painter, lived and died in Moret
 Sarah Tyson Hallowell, art curator, lived and died in Moret
 Harriet Hallowell, artist, lived and died in Moret
 Eliza Pratt Greatorex (1819-1897), American artist lived and died in Moret ("Les remparts", Rue des Fossés)
 Karl Cartier, (1855-1925), French painter.
 Marina Tsvetaïeva, Russian poet
 Prudent Pohl said Zanaroff, (1885-1966) painter
 George Grey Barnard, (1863-1938), sculpteur and collector of medieval art had his atelier from 1903-1911 in Moret

References

External links

 Official site 
 1999 Land Use, from IAURIF (Institute for Urban Planning and Development of the Paris-Île-de-France région) 
 

Former communes of Seine-et-Marne